Peterhans is a German surname. Notable people with the surname include:

 Brigitte Peterhans (1928-2021), German-American architect
 Josef Peterhans (1882–1960), German actor
 Katrin Peterhans, Swiss female curler, European champion
 Walter Peterhans (1897–1960), German photographer and Bauhaus teacher

German-language surnames